Hakuna is a genus of chalcid wasps from the family Eulophidae, containing the only species Hakuna matata. It was named in 2006 from specimens reared from a plant gall collected in a forest in Uganda. H. matata was named after a catchphrase from Disney's 1994 animated film The Lion King (the phrase itself comes from the Swahili phrase . It was thought that this naming would best convey "an African spirit".

References

Eulophidae
Insects described in 2006
Insects of Uganda